"Came Here to Forget" is a song recorded by American country music artist Blake Shelton for his tenth studio album, If I'm Honest (2016) and would be used for Shelton's other album Fully Loaded: God's Country. Released as the album's lead single, the song became digitally available on March 8, 2016. The track was written by Craig Wiseman and Deric Ruttan, while production was handled by Scott Hendricks.

Composition 
"Came Here to Forget" was written by Craig Wiseman and Deric Ruttan, while production was handled by Scott Hendricks.

Critical reception 
Billy Dukes of Taste of Country reviewed the single with favor, praising Shelton's expressive performance as well as progressive style.

Commercial performance 
After its release, "Came Here to Forget" received commercial success in the United States and Canada. The song debuted at No. 1 on Country Digital Song chart on its release with 53,000 sold in its first week, becoming Shelton's fourth No. 1 on the chart.  It also entered the Hot Country Songs chart at No. 6, his highest debut and 25th top 10 on that chart, and at No. 18 On Country Airplay, which equaled Shelton's 2014 song "Neon Light" as his highest entry to the chart. This became Shelton's 22nd number one hit and also his 17th consecutive hit of his career. The song has sold 506,000 copies in the United States as of August 2016.

Music video 
The music video was directed by Trey Fanjoy and premiered in March 2016.

Charts and certifications

Charts

Year end charts

Certifications

References 

2016 songs
2016 singles
Country ballads
2010s ballads
Blake Shelton songs
Music videos directed by Trey Fanjoy
Songs written by Deric Ruttan
Songs written by Craig Wiseman
Song recordings produced by Scott Hendricks
Warner Records Nashville singles